Ahmed Salah (born 19 August 1984), also known as Ahmed Abdel Naeim, is an Egyptian indoor volleyball player. Since 2003 he is a member of the Egypt men's national volleyball team, where he goes by the nickname Salah. He competed at the 2008 and 2016 Summer Olympics and 2006, 2010 and 2014 World Championships.

Abdelhay was named most valuable player (MVP) at the 2011 and 2015 and best server at the 2011 and 2013 African Championships; he was also voted as best spiker at the 2011 World Cup. He is a patriot and refused several offers to change nationality despite the financial privileges.

Honours

Club 

Al Ahly SC 

 Egyptian Volleyball League (11): 2001/02, 2002/03, 2003/04, 2005/06, 2006/07, 2008/09, 2009/10, 2010/11, 2018/19, 2019/20 , 2020/21 .
 Egyptian Volleyball Cup (11) : 2001/02, 2002/03, 2003/04, 2004/05, 2005/06, 2006/07, 2007/08 , 2009/10, 2010/11, 2018/19, 2019/20.
 African Clubs Championship (7): 2003, 2004, 2006, 2010, 2011, 2019 , 2022
 Arab Clubs Championship (6): 2002, 2005, 2006, 2010, 2020 , 2023 .

Egyptian Volleyball Super Cup (1)
  2023

Halkbank Ankara 

 CEV Cup (1): 2012–13
 Turkish Volleyball Cup (1) : 2013–14

Al Gaish 

 Egyptian Volleyball League (2): 2015/16 , 2016/2017.
 Egyptian Volleyball Cup (2): 2014/15, 2016/17.
 African Clubs Championship : 2016

 Al Hilal 

 Arab Clubs Championship: 2011

International

 Men's African Volleyball Championship (6): 2005, 2007, 2009, 2011, 2013, 2015
 Mediterranean Games : 2005
 Volleyball at the African Games : 2003, 2007
  3 × Arab Games : 2006 , 2014 , 2016

Individual

 FIVB Volleyball Men's World Cup Best Spiker (1): 2011
 FIVB Volleyball Men's World Cup Top Scorer (1): 2015
 Men's African Volleyball Championship MVP (1): 2005, 2009, 2011
 Men's African Volleyball Championship Best Server (2): 2007, 2011
 Men's African Volleyball Championship Best Spiker (1): 2007
 Olympic Continental Qualification Tournament (Africa) MVP (1): 2008
 Olympic Continental Qualification Tournament (Africa) Best Spiker (1): 2008
 African Clubs Championship MVP (2): 2009, 2010
 African Clubs Championship Best Spiker (1): 2015
 Arab Clubs Championship MVP: 2006, 2011
 Arab Clubs Championship Best Server: 2005, 2010
 Arab Clubs Championship Best Spiker: 2006
 Egyptian League MVP: 2007
 Egyptian League Best Server: 2001
 Egyptian League Best Spiker: 2001, 2002, 2004, 2005, 2007
 best player & best attacker (in African cup for youth 2002)
 best server (8th rashid international volleyball tournament 2004)

References

External links
 http://www.fivb.org/en/Volleyball/Competitions/GrandChampionCup/2005/men/standings_page1.asp
 https://www.kingfut.com/2018/04/05/al-ahly-african-champions-el-geish/
 http://www.legavolley.it/Statistiche.asp?TipoStat=2.2&Atleta=AHM-ABD-83&AnnoInizio=2006&Giornata=2215&Serie=1

1983 births
Living people
Egyptian men's volleyball players
Al Ahly (men's volleyball) players
Mediterranean Games gold medalists for Egypt
Mediterranean Games medalists in volleyball
Competitors at the 2005 Mediterranean Games
Galatasaray S.K. (men's volleyball) players
Competitors at the 2003 All-Africa Games
Competitors at the 2007 All-Africa Games
African Games competitors for Egypt
21st-century Egyptian people